is a town located in Ōchi District, Shimane Prefecture, Japan.

It was formed on October 1, 2004 from the merger of the village of Daiwa and the town of Ōchi.

As of March 1, 2017 the town has a population of 4,712 and a density of 17 persons per km². The area is 282.92 km².

Local sports facilities include Golden Utopia gym and Ochi Canoe Village.

There are two junior high schools and two elementary schools in Misato.

References

External links

Misato official website 
 Golden Utopia official website 
 Ochi Canoe Village official website 

Towns in Shimane Prefecture